Dawsonville is a city in and the county seat of Dawson County, Georgia, United States. The population was 2,536 at the 2010 census, up from 619 in 2000.

Dawsonville is included in the Atlanta-Sandy Springs-Roswell, GA Metropolitan Statistical Area.

History
Dawsonville was founded in 1857 as seat of the newly formed Dawson County. It was incorporated as a town in 1859 and as a city in 1952. The community and the county are named for state senator William Crosby Dawson.

Geography
Dawsonville is located at 34°25′N 84°7′W.

The community is at the junction of State Routes 9, 53, and 136. SR 9 leads northeast  to Dahlonega and south  to Cumming, while SR 53 leads southeast  to U.S. Route 19 and west  to Jasper. SR 136 also leads to Jasper, on a  route that runs further to the north through the southern end of the Blue Ridge Mountains.

Demographics

2020 census

As of the 2020 United States census, there were 3,720 people, 998 households, and 667 families residing in the city.

2000 census
As of the census of 2000, there were 619 people, 234 households, and 153 families residing in the city. The racial makeup of the city was 97.58% White, 0.16% Native American, 0.97% from other races, and 0.65% from two or more races. Hispanic or Latino people of any race were 3.00% of the population.

There were 234 households, out of which 31.2% had children under the age of 18 living with them, 44.0% were married couples living together, 15.8% had a female householder with no husband present, and 34.6% were non-families. 29.9% of all households were made up of individuals, and 9.4% had someone living alone who was 65 years of age or older. The average household size was 2.31 and the average family size was 2.88.

In the city, the population was spread out, with 22.8% under the age of 18, 12.4% from 18 to 24, 31.5% from 25 to 44, 22.0% from 45 to 64, and 11.3% who were 65 years of age or older. The median age was 34 years. For every 100 females, there were 114.2 males. For every 100 females age 18 and over, there were 117.3 males.

The median income for a household in the city was $34,327, and the median income for a family was $39,000. Males had a median income of $27,500 versus $25,125 for females. The per capita income for the city was $20,207. About 12.3% of families and 11.9% of the population were below the poverty line, including 13.3% of those under age 18 and 15.7% of those age 65 or over.

Recreation

Auto racing

The city's community is known in auto racing circles for its long tradition of involvement in the sport; many racing skills originally developed as a consequence of moonshine activity in the area. Dawsonville celebrates this every October with the yearly "Mountain Moonshine Festival".

Dawsonville is the home of retired NASCAR driver Bill Elliott, who won the Winston Cup championship in 1988 and was inducted into the NASCAR Hall of Fame in 2015, and his son Chase Elliott, who won the 2020 NASCAR Cup Championship and who currently races in the  NASCAR Cup Series. Bill Elliott's nickname is "Awesome Bill from Dawsonville". The city hall has a racing theme as well. Following a significant racing accomplishment made by Bill or Chase Elliott, such as a win, the siren on the Dawsonville Pool Room near the city square goes off to let the town know.

Education

Dawson County School District 
The Dawson County School District holds pre-school to grade twelve, and consists of three elementary schools, two middle schools, and a high school. The district has 219 full-time teachers and 3,036 students.
 Black's Mill Elementary School
 Kilough Elementary School
 Robinson Elementary School
 Riverview Elementary School
 Dawson County Middle School
 Dawson County Junior High School
 Dawson County High School

The Dawson County School System is a charter system.

Notable people
 Spencer Davis, stock car driver 
 Chase Elliott, stock car driver and son of Bill Elliott
 Bill Elliott, "Awesome Bill from Dawsonville", stock car driver
 Jerry Glanville, National Football League head coach, NASCAR driver
 Bill Goldberg, professional wrestler and actor; once resided in Dawsonville
 Roy Hall, moonshine runner and early stock car racing driver, cousin of Lloyd Seay
 Corey Johnson, professional male runway model, actor, producer
 Raymond Parks, moonshine runner and NASCAR pioneer regarded as the first "team" owner in stock car racing, a relative of Seay and Hall
 Lloyd Seay, moonshine runner and early stock car racing driver, cousin of Roy Hall
 Gober Sosebee, race car driver
 Peytan Porter, Country Music Artist

References

External links

 

Cities in Georgia (U.S. state)
Cities in Dawson County, Georgia
County seats in Georgia (U.S. state)
1857 establishments in Georgia (U.S. state)